Designed by Aurelio Lampredi, the Fiasa engine first appeared in the Brazilian-built Fiat 147 in September 1976. The name Fiasa is a portmanteau of "Fiat Automóveis S.A.", for whom it was developed. The in-line four-cylinder engine has five main bearings, a cast iron block with an aluminium cylinder-head with belt-driven overhead camshafts actuating the valves. The engine remained in production until 2001 in Latin America, and also provided the basis for a diesel version (never sold in Brazil, where it was built, as that country did not allow diesel passenger cars). The capacity was initially , but Lampredi designed the engine to be suited for a considerably longer stroke. The last versions of this engine to be built was a 1.5-litre, dedicated-ethanol version developed in Brazil that served the Fiat Uno and its derivatives, and later yet the Fiat Palio (both the hatch and the Weekend) until 2001.

Engine specifications
The Fiasa engine was produced in a number of stroke lengths but always of nearly the same bore. The rod length was an ample , meaning that much larger strokes were possible without any negative consequences. The engine was designed to provide good low-down torque and fuel economy, but not for high peak power, and the compression ratio was a very low 7.2:1 to deal with the low octane petrol commonly available in Brazil at the time. It had a single-barrel carburetor and the intake manifolds were narrow, restricting peak power while providing good performance at lower engine speeds. It had breakerless electronic ignition and chrome-treated exhaust valves with stellite seats, for increased durability. A larger  version arrived in 1979, again tuned for low down torque. This has a  stroke. This larger engine was also available in a sportier version with twin-barrel Webers (imported from Italy) and more power. A third version of the 1.3 was Fiat's and the world's first modern ethanol-powered engine. As exports to Europe commenced, the 1.3 was later bored out by 0.1 mm, to nudge the displacement above 1.3 liters. The diesel derivative was also of this dimension.

The Brazilian engines were also exported to Europe in large numbers, both for the 127, Ritmo, and the later Uno as well as a few Milles/Dunas/Elbas sold by Innocenti. The fully finished engines were shipped in large containers containing 144 engines each. The 1.05 was also installed in the Autobianchi Y10, where it was also available with turbocharging.

Fiat later made a very short-lived  derivative, using a  stroke. This was only installed in the sporty Fiat Oggi CSS, which was built in 300 examples in 1984. This engine produces . The little 1050 was discontinued in 1989 as well. The final iteration was developed to fit Brazil's new sub-1 liter tax category and was introduced in 1990. With a single carburetor, the new engine's specifications were very similar to the 1.05. A higher-powered, twin-barrel ethanol-powered version was introduced in 1991 for the Uno Brio but was discontinued shortly thereafter as it could not meet the new emissions regulations which took effect in January 1992. With these, only the single-barrel 1.0 (now catalyzed) and the 1.5 remained available.

The catalyzed 1.0 was not cost effective, and for 1993 Fiat switched to an electronically controlled, double-barrel Weber 495 carburetor and was able to forego the catalyst. The new "Mille Electronic" cost less to build and power was higher than before the new emissions impositions. However, the production cars appear not to have met the 1992 standards and in November 1995 Fiat was fined R$ 3.93 million ($ in  dollars) for the 429,928 non-conforming Mille Electronic/ELX sold between December 1992 to June 1995.

Applications
List of vehicles using variations of the Fiasa engine (incomplete):

Petrol engine
 Fiat 147/Spazio: 1976-1987
 Fiat 127: 1979-1987 (export version for Europe)
 Fiat Fiorino: 1979-2000 
 Fiat Panorama: 1980-1986
 Fiat Oggi: 1983-1985
 Fiat Uno/Mille: 1984-2001 (Latin American version)
 Fiat Prêmio/Duna/Elba: 1985-1999
 Fiat Ritmo: 1979-198?
 Innocenti Mille: 1994-1997
 Fiat Palio: 1996-2001
 Autobianchi/Lancia Y10: 1985-1995

Diesel engine
 Fiat 127: 1981-1987 (export version for Europe)
 Fiat 147/148/Spazio: 1981-1990
 Fiat Panorama (export version for Europe)
 Fiat Uno: 1983-1989 (Europe)
 Fiat Panda: 1986-1989 (until 1994 in the Panda Van)
 Fiat Fiorino: 1981-1987 
 Fiat Duna: 1987-1991 (export version)

Footnotes

Fiasa
Straight-four engines
Gasoline engines by model